12 teams took part in the league with FC Dynamo Moscow winning the championship.

League standings

Results

Top scorers
24 goals
 Vsevolod Bobrov (CDKA Moscow)

21 goals
 Vasili Kartsev (Dynamo Moscow)

18 goals
 Sergei Solovyov (Dynamo Moscow)

14 goals
 Grigory Fedotov (CDKA Moscow)
 Vasili Panfilov (Torpedo Moscow)

11 goals
 Aleksandr Fyodorov (Dynamo Leningrad)
 Valentin Nikolayev (CDKA Moscow)

10 goals
 Vladimir Dyomin (CDKA Moscow)
 Aleksandr Malyavkin (Dynamo Moscow)
 Aleksandr Sevidov (Krylia Sovetov Moscow)

Soviet Cup
The Soviet cup was won by CSKA Moscow who beat FC Dynamo Moscow in the final 2-1.

References

1945
Top League
Soviet
Soviet